The 2020 European Men's U-20 Handball Championship was going to be the 13th edition of the European Men's U-20 Handball Championship, and was planned to be held in Porec, Croatia from 7 to 17 January 2021.

It was originally scheduled to take place from 2 to 12 July 2020 in Innsbruck, Austria and Brixen, Italy. On 27 October 2020, the EHF cancelled the tournament due to the COVID-19 pandemic.

Qualification

Draw
The draw was held on 15 January 2020 in Vienna.

Preliminary round

Group A

Group B

Group C

Group D

References

External links 
 Official website 
 EHF 

European U-20 Handball Championship
European U-20 Handball Championship
European Men's Under-20 Handball Championship
European U-20 Handball Championship
European U-20 Handball Championship
European U-20 Handball Championship